The 1981 Australasian Individual Speedway Championship was the sixth annual Australasian Final for Motorcycle speedway riders from Australia and New Zealand as part of the qualification for the 1981 Speedway World Championship.

This was the final time the Australasian Championship was staged. It was held at the  Liverpool City Raceway in Sydney. The Final was easily won by six time World Champion Ivan Mauger who scored a 15-point maximum to win his second Australasian Championship. Surprisingly, Australia's leading riders Phil Crump and reigning Australian Champion Billy Sanders (who was actually riding on his home track) failed to qualify for the Overseas Final to be held at the White City Stadium in London, England. Sanders won a runoff with Crump to be the reserve rider in London.

1981 Australasian Final
February 28
 Sydney, Australia - Liverpool City Raceway
Referee: Sam Bass
Qualification: First 4 plus 1 reserve to the Overseas Final in London, England

References

See also
 Sport in Australia
 Motorcycle Speedway

Speedway in New Zealand
1981 in speedway
Individual Speedway Championship